Veronica Smith (born 9 July 1942) is an American fencer. She competed in the women's individual and team foil events at the 1968 Summer Olympics.

References

External links
 

1942 births
Living people
American female foil fencers
Olympic fencers of the United States
Fencers at the 1968 Summer Olympics
Sportspeople from Budapest
Pan American Games medalists in fencing
Pan American Games gold medalists for the United States
Fencers at the 1967 Pan American Games
21st-century American women